RAAF University Squadrons were formed in each state of Australia in 1950 as part of the Citizen Air Force (CAF). They were formed to provide officer training to undergraduates who would then serve as commissioned officers in the RAAF General Reserve. Each squadron consisted of a number of specialist flights including: Flying, Medical, Equipment, Administrative and Technical. The squadrons were disbanded in 1973 following the end of conscription. Approximately 3,100 commissioned officers were trained by the various squadrons over the period of 24 years.

University squadrons

New South Wales
Formed as the Sydney University Squadron on 16 October 1950, its motto was Eadem Mens Alta Petendi. The squadron changed its name to the New South Wales University Squadron in March 1967. It was disbanded on 31 October 1973.

Queensland 

Formed on 31 October 1950 in Brisbane, its motto was Peritus Ac Paratus. It was disbanded on 25 August 1973.

South Australian
Formed as the Adelaide University Squadron on 10 November 1950, its motto was Astra Pete Discendo. The squadron changed its name to the South Australian University Squadron on 11 January 1967. It was disbanded on 28 September 1973.

Tasmanian
Formed on 3 November 1950 in Hobart, its motto was Ingeniis Patuit Campus. It was disbanded on 25 August 1973.

Victorian
Formed on 25 October 1950 in Melbourne, its motto was Strength From Knowledge. It was disbanded on 18 October 1973.

Western Australian
Formed on 30 October 1950 in Perth, its motto was Scientia Potentia. It was disbanded on 24 August 1973.

Notes

References

Royal Australian Air Force
Military units and formations established in 1950
Military units and formations disestablished in 1973